Mario Eugenio Dolmo Flores (born 31 July 1965 in Puerto Cortés) is a retired Honduran footballer.

Club career
Born in Puerto Cortés, Flores began his footballing career at local side Platense. He soon arrived to renowned Olimpia, where he would make his name later leaving for Santos Laguna. In November 2012 he was nominated to become a "Guerrero de Honor" (Warrior of Honour) of Santos.

He also had a season in Peru with Universitario, where he played alongside compatriot César Obando, and in Costa Rica with Alajuelense. After a few seasons back in Honduras he retired after playing on 26 May 2001 for Broncos then moved abroad again to play in El Salvador with Isidro Metapán in the 2002 Clausura.

He was later dismissed by Nicaraguans Real Estelí in October 2003 and duly finished his career. He played with Alex Pineda Chacón, Danilo Galindo, Juan Carlos Espinoza, Nahúm Espinoza and Belarmino Rivera in the Olimpia and they won the CONCACAF Champions League in 1988.

International career
A left-sided forward, Flores made his debut for Honduras in the late 1980s and has earned a total of 42 caps, scoring 6 goals. He has represented his country in 12 FIFA World Cup qualification matches and played at the 1993 UNCAF Nations Cup as well as at the 1991 and 1993 CONCACAF Gold Cups.

International goals
Scores and results list Honduras' goal tally first.

Personal life
Dolmo Flores is married to Brenda.
In March 2013, his daughter Melania Yazareth Dolmo Gutiérrez and her husband were killed in Puerto Cortés.

Honours and awards

Club
C.D. Olimpia
Liga Profesional de Honduras (5): 1987–88, 1989–90, 1992–93, 1995–96, 1996–97
Honduran Cup: (2): 1995, 1998
Honduran Supercup: (1): 1997
CONCACAF Champions League (1): 1988

Country
Honduras
Copa Centroamericana (1): 1993,

References

External links

 Dolmo Flores: Olimpia selló el título nacional (Interview and profile) - La Tribuna 
 

1965 births
Living people
People from Puerto Cortés
Association football forwards
Honduran footballers
Honduras international footballers
1991 CONCACAF Gold Cup players
1993 CONCACAF Gold Cup players
Platense F.C. players
C.D. Suchitepéquez players
C.D. Olimpia players
Santos Laguna footballers
L.D. Alajuelense footballers
Club Universitario de Deportes footballers
C.D. Victoria players
A.D. Isidro Metapán footballers
Real Estelí F.C. players
Honduran expatriate footballers
Honduran expatriate sportspeople in Mexico
Honduran expatriate sportspeople in Guatemala
Honduran expatriate sportspeople in Costa Rica
Honduran expatriate sportspeople in Nicaragua
Expatriate footballers in Guatemala
Expatriate footballers in Mexico
Expatriate footballers in Costa Rica
Expatriate footballers in Peru
Expatriate footballers in El Salvador
Expatriate footballers in Nicaragua
Liga Nacional de Fútbol Profesional de Honduras players
Liga FPD players
Liga MX players
1996 CONCACAF Gold Cup players